Galagete gnathodoxa is a moth in the family Autostichidae. It was described by Edward Meyrick in 1926. It is found on the Galápagos Islands.

References

Moths described in 1926
Galagete